The Temple of Hera II (also erroneously called the Temple of Neptune or of Poseidon), is a Greek temple in Paestum, Campania, Italy. It was built in the Doric order around 460–450 BC, just north of the first Hera Temple.  If still in use by the 4th-and 5th century, it would have been closed during the persecution of pagans in the late Roman Empire.

Description

The temple has six columns along its shorter sides and fourteen columns along its longer sides.  The columns do not have the typical 20 flutes on each column but have 24 flutes. The Temple of Hera II also has a wider column size and smaller intervals between columns. The entasis, or curve, of its columns give a stronger visual presence. This temple is aligned with a double peaked mountain considered to be sacred by the Greeks.

The name "Temple of Neptune" is a misnomer from the 18th century, even though it was actually dedicated to the goddess Hera. It is listed as a UNESCO World Heritage Site.

The temple was also used to worship Zeus and another deity, whose identity is unknown. There are visible on the east side the remains of two altars, one large and one smaller. The smaller one is a Roman addition, built when a road leading to a Roman forum was cut through the larger one. It also is possible that the temple originally was dedicated to both Hera and Poseidon; some offertory statues found around the larger altar are thought to demonstrate this identification.

The Temple of Hera II resembles the Temple of Zeus at Olympia. With the other temples at Paestum it is one of the best preserved early Greek temples.

Gallery

See also
Magna Graecia

Sources 
Temple of Hera II, archaic Doric temple, 470–460 BCE

Buildings and structures in the Province of Salerno
Cilento
Hera, Paestum
Paestum
Tourist attractions in Campania
5th-century BC religious buildings and structures
Paestum (ancient city)